Haseena Maan Jaayegi is a 1999 Indian Hindi-language comedy film directed by David Dhawan. It stars  Govinda, Sanjay Dutt, Karisma Kapoor and Pooja Batra, with Anupam Kher, Kader Khan, Aruna Irani, and Paresh Rawal in supporting. The film is thematically inspired by the 1966 film Pyar Kiye Jaa. It released on 25th June 1999 with positive critical reception and went on to become the fifth-highest-grossing Hindi film of 1999. It is often regarded as being amongst Govinda's greatest performances and he won many awards for his role as Monu and Chachaji.

Pyar Kiye Ja itself is a remake of the 1964 Tamil classic film Kadhalikka Neramillai which had been remade as the Telugu film Preminchi Choodu (1965), the Hindi film Pyar Kiye Jaa (1966), and the Kannada film Preethi Madu Thamashe Nodu (1979).

Plot
Amirchand is the ill-fated father of two mischievous sons—Sonu and Monu. Both of them are always up to one prank or another, most of them aimed at stealing money from Amirchand.

In the opening scene, they call up their father, acting like gangsters, and ask for a huge sum if he wants to live. The plan fails as Amirchand turns out to be the driver of the taxi in which they were escaping. Later, they fix up the marriage of their father with Shakuntala and take one lakh rupees as advance dowry from her brother Jamnadas. This plan also fails as Amirchand refuses to entertain Jamnadas and his sister.

Amirchand warns their sons to become serious towards life if they want to live in his home. He asks Monu to join office and Sonu to go to Goa for claiming some money he had lent to someone. Whereas Monu plays another prank by calling up a girls' hostel and flirting with Ritu, Sonu mistakenly goes to one Gulzarilal Verma for claiming the money, where he meets Pooja. Both Ritu and Pooja are Gulzarilal's daughters.

Sonu and Monu fall in love with Pooja and Ritu, respectively. Sonu calls up Monu to come to Goa, disguised as his Uncle for fixing up his and Pooja's marriage. This leads to a series of confusions as Gulzarilal's sister Santho also falls in love with Monu (disguised as Uncle).

To get rid of the problem, Sonu and Monu throw a dummy of the Uncle from top of a cliff, only to land up getting arrested for killing the non-existent uncle. Amirchand learns of this and reaches Goa with his assistant Kunj Bihari. In favour of the story's and Sonu and Monu's fate, Amirchand and Gulzarilal turn out to be long lost friends. Together they set out towards the nearest police station when they get kidnapped by a Bhai. Sonu and Monu escape from the lockup with Bhootnath's help and rescue their father and father-in-law-to-be, thus proving to be worthy sons.

Cast
 Govinda as Monu
 Sanjay Dutt as Sonu
 Karishma Kapoor as Ritu Verma
 Pooja Batra as Pooja Verma
 Kader Khan as Amirchand
 Paresh Rawal as Bhootnath
 Satish Kaushik as Kunj Bihari
 Aruna Irani as Santho Verma
 Anupam Kher as Gulzarilal Verma
 Ashish Vidyarthi as Bhai (gangster)
 Aasif Sheikh as Pritam Nath
 Razak Khan as Bhai's henchman
 Mohan Joshi as Prem Nath
 Pushpa Verma as Premnath's wife
 Bindu as Shakuntala, (guest appearance)
 Asrani as Jamnadas, (guest appearance)
 Shakti Kapoor as himself
 Anil Dhawan as Police Commissioner
 Mahavir Shah as Goa's Police Inspector

Soundtrack

Trivia
 In the beginning of the film, Sonu and Monu are in a restaurant and don't have money to pay the bill. Monu picks the pocket of Shakti Kapoor for his wallet and then tries to keep it back but his hand gets stuck. This scene is taken from The Return of Mr. Bean, an episode from the Mr. Bean television series. This scene is repeated in the movie Dhamaal.
 The lead actress Karisma Kapoor's mother, Babita, and great uncle, Shashi Kapoor, also starred in a movie of the same name.

Awards 

 45th Filmfare Awards:

Won

 Best Comedian – Govinda

Nominated

 Best Music Director – Anu Malik
1st IIFA Awards:

Nominated

 Best Actor – Govinda
 Best Supporting Actress – Aruna Irani
 Best Comedian – Anupam Kher
 Best Music Director – Anu Malik

See also
 List of Indian comedy films

References

External links

1990s Hindi-language films
1999 films
Films directed by David Dhawan
Films scored by Anu Malik
Films scored by Aadesh Shrivastava
Hindi remakes of Tamil films